The 1969 World Chess Championship was played between Tigran Petrosian and Boris Spassky in Moscow from April 14 to June 17, 1969. This was the second consecutive time Petrosian and Spassky played for the world title. Spassky reversed the previous result; winning the world title and becoming the tenth World Chess Champion.

1967 Interzonal

The 1967 Interzonal Tournament was played in Sousse, Tunisia in October and November. The first six placegetters qualified for the Candidates, along with Boris Spassky and Mikhail Tal who were seeded into the Candidates matches as finalists of the previous tournament.

A major controversy occurred when Bobby Fischer, who was leading the tournament with seven wins and three draws in ten rounds, abandoned the event over a dispute with the organisers. Because Fischer withdrew before he had played half his games, the results of his games were not included in his opponents' totals.

Bent Larsen went on to win, with  Korchnoi, Geller, Gligorić, and Portisch taking the next four places.

There was a three-way tie for sixth place among Samuel Reshevsky, Vlastimil Hort, and Leonid Stein, who played a round-robin playoff to determine the final place in the Candidates matches. In the event of a tie, the player with the best Sonneborn-Berger tie break from the Interzonal would qualify. The playoff ended in a three-way tie, so Reshevsky qualified.

{| class="wikitable"
|+ 1967 Sousse Interzonal Tournament
|-
!  !! !! 1 !! 2 !! 3 !! 4 !! 5 !! 6 !! 7 !! 8 !! 9 !! 10 !! 11 !! 12 !! 13 !! 14 !! 15 !! 16 !! 17 !! 18 !! 19 !! 20 !! 21 !! 22 !! Total !! Tie break
|- style="background:#ccffcc;"
| 1 || align=left| || - || 0 || ½ || ½ || 0 || 1 || 1 || 1 || 1 || ½ || 1 || 1 || 1 || ½ || 0 || 1 || ½ || 1 || 1 || 1 || 1 || 1 || 15½ || 
|- style="background:#ccffcc;"
| 2 || align=left| || 1 || - || ½ || ½ || 1 || ½ || ½ || ½ || 0 || ½ || 0 || 0 || ½ || 1 || 1 || 1 || 1 || 1 || 1 || 1 || ½ || 1 || 14 || 136.00
|- style="background:#ccffcc;"
| 3 ||  || ½ || ½ || - || ½ || ½ || 0 || 1 || ½ || 1 || ½ || ½ || 1 || ½ || ½ || 1 || ½ || ½ || 1 || ½ || 1 || 1 || 1 || 14 || 135.75
|- style="background:#ccffcc;"
| 4 || align=left| || ½ || ½ || ½ || - || ½ || ½ || ½ || 1 || ½ || ½ || ½ || ½ || ½ || 1 || 1 || ½ || ½ || ½ || 1 || 1 || 1 || 1 || 14 || 135.00
|- style="background:#ccffcc;"
| 5 || align=left| || 1 || 0 || ½ || ½ || - || ½ || ½ || 1 || 0 || ½ || ½ || ½ || ½ || 1 || 1 || ½ || 1 || ½ || ½ || 1 || 1 || 1 || 13½ || 
|- style="background:#ccffcc;"
| 6 || align=left| || 0 || ½ || 1 || ½ || ½ || - || ½ || ½ || 1 || ½ || ½ || 1 || ½ || ½ || ½ || ½ || 1 || 1 || 0 || 1 || 1 || ½ || 13 || 129.75
|-
| 7 || align=left| || 0 || ½ || 0 || ½ || ½ || ½ || - || 1 || ½ || ½ || 1 || ½ || ½ || ½ || ½ || ½ || ½ || 1 || 1 || 1 || 1 || 1 || 13 || 120.25
|-
| 8 || align=left| || 0 || ½ || ½ || 0 || 0 || ½ || 0 || - || ½ || ½ || ½ || 1 || 1 || ½ || 1 || 1 || 1 || 1 || 1 || 1 || 1 || ½ || 13 || 117.00
|-
| 9 || align=left| || 0 || 1 || 0 || ½ || 1 || 0 || ½ || ½ || - || 0 || 1 || 1 || ½ || 1 || 0 || ½ || ½ || 1  || 1 || ½ || 1 || 1 || 12½ || 
|-
| 10 || align=left| || ½ || ½ || ½ || ½ || ½ || ½ || ½ || ½ || 1 || - || ½ || 1 || ½ || ½ || ½ || ½ || 1 || ½ || 0 || 1 || ½ || ½ || 12 || 
|-
| 11 || align=left| || 0 || 1 || ½ || ½ || ½ || ½ || 0 || ½ || 0 || ½ || - || 0 || ½ || ½ || 1 || ½ || 1 || ½ || 1 || 0 || 1 || 1 || 11 || 103.50
|-
| 12 || align=left| || 0 || 1 || 0 || ½ || ½ || 0 || ½ || 0 || 0 || 0 || 1 || - || 1 || 1 || 1 || ½ || ½ || ½ || 1 || ½ || 1 || ½ || 11 || 102.50
|-
| 13 ||  || 0 || ½ || ½ || ½ || ½ || ½ || ½ || 0 || ½ || ½ || ½ || 0 || - || ½ || 0 || 1 || ½ || 0 || 1 || ½ || 1 || 1 || 10 || 93.75
|-
| 14 ||  || ½ || 0 || ½ || 0 || 0 || ½ || ½ || ½ || 0 || ½ || ½ || 0 || ½ || - || ½ || 1 || ½ || 1 || 0 || 1 || 1 || 1 || 10 || 90.00
|-
| 15 ||  || 1 || 0 || 0 || 0 || 0 || ½ || ½ || 0 || 1 || ½ || 0 || 0 || 1 || ½ || - || ½ || 1 || 0 || ½ || 1 || ½ || 1 || 9½ || 
|-
| 16 ||  || 0 || 0 || ½ || ½ || ½ || ½ || ½ || 0 || ½ || ½ || ½ || ½ || 0 || 0 || ½ || - || ½ || ½ || 1 || 0 || 1 || 1 || 9 || 
|-
| 17 ||  || ½ || 0 || ½ || ½ || 0 || 0 || ½ || 0 || ½ || 0 || 0 || ½ || ½ || ½ || 0 || ½ || - || ½ || 1 || ½ || ½ || 1 || 8 || 
|-
| 18 ||  || 0 || 0 || 0 || ½ || ½ || 0 || 0 || 0 || 0 || ½ || ½ || ½ || 1 || 0 || 1 || ½ || ½ || - || 1 || ½ || ½ || 0 || 7½ || 
|-
| 19 ||  || 0 || 0 || ½ || 0 || ½ || 1 || 0 || 0 || 0 || 1 || 0 || 0 || 0 || 1 || ½ || 0 || 0 || 0 || - || 0 || 1 || 1 || 6½ || 61.00
|-
| 20 ||  || 0 || 0 || 0 || 0 || 0 || 0 || 0 || 0 || ½ || 0 || 1 || ½ || ½ || 0 || 0 || 1 || ½ || ½ || 1 || - || 0 || 1 || 6½ || 54.50
|-
| 21 ||  || 0 || ½ || 0 || 0 || 0 || 0 || 0 || 0 || 0 || ½ || 0 || 0 || 0 || 0 || ½ || 0 || ½ || ½ || 0 || 1 || - || ½ || 4 || 
|-
| 22 ||  || 0 || 0 || 0 || 0 || 0 || ½ || 0 || ½ || 0 || ½ || 0 || ½ || 0 || 0 || 0 || 0 || 0 || 1 || 0 || 0 || ½ || - || 3½ || 
|}

{| class="wikitable"
|+ 1968 Los Angeles playoff
|-
!  !! !! 1 !! 2 !! 3 !! Total 
|- style="background:#ccffcc;"
| 1 || align=left| || align=center|- || ==== || ==== || 4 
|-
| 2 || align=left| || ==== || align=center|- || =0=1 || 4 
|-
| 3 || align=left| || ==== || =1=0 || align=center|- || 4 
|}

1968 Candidates matches

Spassky won the Candidates Tournament – as he did in the 1966 cycle – earning the right to challenge Petrosian for the World Championship a second time.

Larsen and Tal contested a third place playoff in the Dutch town of Eersel in March 1969, which Larsen won 5½–2½.

1969 Championship match

The match was played as best of 24 games. If it ended 12-12, Petrosian, the title holder, would retain the Championship.

Spassky won.

References

External links
1969 World Chess Championship at the Internet Archive record of Graeme Cree's Chess Pages

1969
1967 in chess
1968 in chess
1969 in chess
Chess in the Soviet Union
1967 in Tunisian sport
Chess in Tunisia
1969 in Russia
1969 in Soviet sport
1969 in Moscow